Senecký is a surname. Notable people with the surname include:

Karel Senecký (1919–1979), Czech footballer
Štefan Senecký (born 1980), Slovak footballer